The Crane & Breed was an American automobile manufactured between 1912 and 1917.  A product of Cincinnati, the company produced a 48 hp six in 1912, before turning its attention mainly to the crafting of ambulances and hearses.

References

Defunct motor vehicle manufacturers of the United States
Motor vehicle manufacturers based in Ohio
Defunct companies based in Ohio